Handsome Harry is a 2009 American film written by Nicholas T. Proferes and directed by Bette Gordon. The first project produced by Worldview Entertainment, it stars Jamey Sheridan, Steve Buscemi and Aidan Quinn. It premiered at the 2009 Tribeca Film Festival and was released theatrically in 2010 by Paladin/Emerging Pictures and on DVD/VOD by Screen Media Films.

Plot
Handsome Harry is the story of Harry Sweeney's journey to find forgiveness from an old Navy friend. One day Harry gets a call from an old Navy buddy, Kelley, who is on his deathbed. At first, Harry wants nothing to do with Kelley, but soon memories and guilt overcome him and he goes on a journey to confront his old friends.

First he goes to meet Kelley in a Philadelphia hospital. Kelley asks Harry to seek forgiveness from David on his behalf. Kelley dies in the hospital the next day. Harry then goes on to meet more of his Navy buddies to find the truth about what actually happened the night they assaulted David together. Somebody dropped a generator on David's hand that night, but Harry could not recollect who it was.

In time it is revealed that Harry and David were having an affair back in the Navy. Kelley found Harry and David in a sexually compromising position in the shower. In fear of repercussion, Harry turned on David. Kelley and rest of the gang including Harry got drunk and assaulted David. It was in the end revealed that Harry was the one who dropped the generator on David, maiming him for life.

Cast
 Jamey Sheridan as Harry Sweeney
 Campbell Scott as David Kagan
 Steve Buscemi as Thomas Kelley
 Aidan Quinn as Professor Porter
 John Savage as Peter Reems
 Titus Welliver as Gebhardt
 Karen Young as Muriel
 Bill Sage as Pauly
 Mariann Mayberry as Judy Rheems

References

External links
 
 

2000s English-language films
American independent films
Films set in New York City
American drama road movies
2009 independent films
2000s drama road movies
2009 films
American LGBT-related films
Worldview Entertainment films
LGBT-related drama films
Gay-related films
2009 drama films
2009 LGBT-related films
Films directed by Bette Gordon
Films scored by Anton Sanko
2000s American films